The red blind snake (Acutotyphlops infralabialis) is a species of snake in the Typhlopidae family. It is endemic to the Solomon Islands.

References

Acutotyphlops
Reptiles of the Solomon Islands
Endemic fauna of the Solomon Islands
Reptiles described in 1918